Topic was a chocolate bar made by Mars, Incorporated in France and sold throughout Europe.  It contained hazelnuts, nougat and caramel.

The bar was first introduced in 1962. In the UK, it was advertised with the line "A Hazelnut in Every Bite".

The chocolate bar was promoted in a series of radio advertisements broadcast in 2002 with the strapline "A joy to eat, but a bitch to make". These adverts featured actors Simon Pegg and Mark Heap who both appeared in the cult British TV comedy Spaced.

The bar was removed from boxes of Celebrations in 2006, along with Twix (although Twix has subsequently been reintroduced).

In 2022 Mars, Incorporated ceased production.

See also
 List of chocolate bar brands

References

Chocolate bars
British confectionery
Mars confectionery brands
Products introduced in 1962